The Men's discus throw at the 2010 Commonwealth Games as part of the athletics programme was held at the Jawaharlal Nehru Stadium on Saturday 9 and Sunday 10 October 2010.

Records

Results

Qualifying round
Qualification: Qualifying Performance 60.00 (Q) or at least 12 best performers (q) advance to the Final.

Final

External links
2010 Commonwealth Games - Athletics

Men's discus throw
2010